Max Oesten (var: Otto Max Oesten, Max Otto Östen, Otto Östen) 1843–1917, was a German pianist, organist and prolific composer, although nowadays his work is generally overlooked.

Life
Max Oesten was born in Berlin the son of the German composer Theodor/e Oesten. He spent most of his professional life as a church organist in Königsburg. Oesten was a pupil of August Wilhelm Bach. Among Oesten's pupils was the German-American fiddler Otto Funk.

List of works

Choral
 op. ? (1879) Aufforderung zum Tanz: polka-rondo (mixed choir and piano).
 op. 151 (c.1887) Drei Lieder Songs for Male-voice choir: 'Frühlingsahnung', 'Waldeseinsamkeit', 'Fröhliche Fahrt'.
 op. 225 (1914) Für Kaiser und Reich (male-voice choir and orchestra).

Harmonium and/or Organ
 op. 26  (n.d.) Trauermarsch (after Beethoven op. 26) arr. for harmonium/organ.
 op. 196 (1897) Twelve easy voluntaries: second set (harmonium/organ).
 op. 205 (1899) Festival times: ten short and easy pieces (harmonium/organ).
 op. ?   (1899) Twelve Select voluntaries (harmonium/organ). 
 op. 215 (1902) Twelve short voluntaries: third set (harmonium/organ).

Harmonium and/or piano
 op. 131 (1885) [Schubert] Lieder ... concertmässig als Duos (harmonium and piano).
 op. 135 (1885) Lieder der Heimat: fanntasien über beliebte Volksweisen (harmonium and piano).
 op. 138 (1886-7) Die Oper am Harmonium. Fantasien über beliebte Opern (harmonium, and piano; two pianos).
 op. 140 Träume am Harmonium (harmonium).
 op. 141 (1887) Leichte Original-Duos (harmonium and piano; two pianos).
 op. 222 (n.d.) Klänge am Harmonium: 50 geistliche Lieder und Gesänge (harmonium).

Harp
 op. ? (n.d.) Largo (from 'Serse' by Handel) arr, for  harp, harmonium and piano/organ.

Piano
 op. ? (1869) Felice Notte (piano).<ref name=copac1>>[https://discover.libraryhub.jisc.ac.uk/search?q=max+oesten 'Max Oesten': works listed in Library Hub Discover (UK)]. Web resource, accessed 14 December 2021.</ref>
 op. ? (1869) La Belle Espagnole (piano).
 op. ? (1869) Champagne Pearls, morceau de salon (piano).
 op. ? (1870) Abendglockenklänge (piano).
 op. ? (1870) Accents du Cœur/Herzensklänge: nocturne (piano).
 op. ? (1870) Melodiengrüsse: kleine Fantasien über beliebte Volkslieder (piano).
 op. ? (1870) Féodora: polka-mazurka (piano).
 op. ? (1870) La Jolie Vivandière. Die hübsche Marketenderin (piano).
 op. ? (1870) Langage des Fleurs: rêverie (piano).
 op. ? (1870) Leontine: nocturne (piano).
 op. ? (1872) Ma Tourterelle: mélodie (piano)  
 op. ? (1873) Bluebells (piano).  
 op. ? (1873) Spielmanns Gruss: romanze (piano).
 op. ? (1874) Accents du Cœur (piano).
 op. ? (1874) Evening Bells (piano).
 op. 40 (n.d.) Schweizerbilder: im leichteren Salonstyl (piano).
 op. 45 (n.d.) Mein Stern (piano)  
 op. 71 (1878) Frühlingsglaube, after F. Ries (piano).
 op. 77 (1878) Schlusslied (piano).
 op. 124 (1887) Elfengeflüster: characterstück (piano).
 op. 126 (1884) Weihnachtsidyll: tonbild (piano).
 op. 128 (1885) Glockenthürmers Töchterlein (piano: four hamds).
 op. 129 (1885) Sommerfäden (piano: four hands).
 op. 130 (1887) Abendgebet (violin, 'cello, piano and harmonium/organ) 
 op. 168 (1890) Weihnachtsklänge (piano)

 Solo strings
 op. 142 (1885) Stunden der Weihe. (Six pieces for violin/'cello and harmonium/organ/piano). 
 op. ? (1898) Six easy pieces (violin and piano).
 op. 201 (1899) Six easy pieces: second set) (violin and piano).

External links
 Public domain copies of works by Max Oesten at IMSLP. Web resource, accessed 16 December 2021.
 Works by Max Oesten listed in the catalogues (Monatsberichte'') of the Leipzig music publisher Friedrich Hofmeister for the years 1829–1900. Web resource, accessed 18 December 2021.
 Max Oesten. Christmas (1899). Andrew Pink (2022) Exordia ad missam.

References

1843 births
1917 deaths
German classical organists
Composers for pipe organ
German male organists
German Romantic composers
German male classical composers
19th-century German musicians
19th-century German composers
19th-century German male musicians
19th-century classical composers
20th-century German musicians
20th-century German composers
20th-century German male musicians
20th-century classical composers
Male classical organists